Barbagallo is a surname. Notable people with the surname include:

 Alf Barbagallo (born 1942), Australian racing car driver and businessman
 Jess Barbagallo, American playwright and performer

See also
 93061 Barbagallo, a main-belt asteroid
 Barbagallo Raceway, a motorsport circuit located in Neerabup, Western Australia